4th OTO Awards

Reduta, Bratislava, Slovakia

Overall winner  Zdena Studenková

Hall of Fame  Eva Krížiková

EuroTelevízia Award  IQ Test národa

◄ 3rd | 5th ►

The 4th OTO Awards, honoring the best in Slovak popular culture for the year 2003, took time and place on January 31, 2004, at the Reduta concert hall in Bratislava. Unlike the previous editions of the show, the ceremony broadcast live JOJ. The host of the show, for a change, was actor Maroš Kramár.

Performers
 Lenka Filipová, musician
 Jana Kirschner, singer
 Ján Kuric and Vidiek, band
 Martin Maxa, singer
 Misha, singer
 No Name, band
 R.A.D.O., singer

Winners and nominees

Main categories
 Television

 Music

Others

References

External links
 Archive > OTO 2003 – 4th edition  (Official website)
 OTO 2003 – 4th edition (Official website - old)

04
2003 in Slovak music
2003 in Slovak television
2003 television awards